Overberg or Overburg may refer to:

In South Africa
 The Overberg region in the Western Cape province of South Africa
 The Overberg District Municipality, a municipality in the Overberg region
 The Overberg Test Range, a rocket launch site and weapons systems testing facility in the Overberg
 AFB Overberg, a South African Air Force base
 Overberg branch line, a railway line

Other
 Overberg (Netherlands), a town in the Netherlands
 Bernhard Heinrich Overberg (1754–1826), Catholic ecclesiastical educator